Lelio Veterano (died 1619) was a Roman Catholic prelate who served as Bishop of Fondi (1616–1619).

Biography
Lelio Veterano was born in 1580.
On 5 December 1616, he was appointed during the papacy of Pope Paul V as Bishop of Fondi.
On 13 December 1616, he was consecrated bishop by Giovanni Garzia Mellini, Cardinal-Priest of Santi Quattro Coronati, with Francesco Sacrati (cardinal), Titular Archbishop of Damascus, and Vincenzo Landinelli, Bishop of Albenga, serving as co-consecrators. 
He served as Bishop of Fondi until his death in 1619.

References 

17th-century Italian Roman Catholic bishops
Bishops appointed by Pope Paul V
1580 births
1619 deaths